Paraguay's bicameral Congress (Congreso) consists of a 45-member Senate and an 
80-member Chamber of Deputies. It serves as the legislative branch of the Paraguayan state.

Both chambers of Congress are elected concurrently with the president by means of a proportional representation system. 
Deputies are elected by department and Senators on a nationwide basis.

Latest election

Senate

Chamber of Deputies

See also
 Chamber of Deputies of Paraguay
 Senate of Paraguay
 Politics of Paraguay
 List of Jesuit sites
 List of legislatures by country

External links
http://www.senado.gov.py/ Senate
http://www.diputados.gov.py/ Chamber of Deputies

Paraguay
Politics of Paraguay
Political organisations based in Paraguay
Paraguay